Franklin Road Academy (FRA) is a private co-educational Christian school for students in pre-kindergarten through grade 12 located in Oak Hill, Tennessee. The school was founded in 1971 and originally affiliated with the First Christian Church before it became a separate incorporated organization in 1982. Like other schools established in the period after a court ordered Nashville public schools to expanded desegregation busing, FRA has been described as segregation academy.

The school's mission states that it is "a challenging educational experience in an inclusive Christian community with an unwavering commitment to develop leaders of integrity and purpose." Its head of school is Sean Casey and its head of upper school is Jay Salato. In 2016, FRA's enrollment was 795 students with ethnic and racial minority students comprising 18 percent of the student body. As of 2021, the school's enrollment had increased to 925 students. Its enrollment increased to 1,040 students in 2022. FRA is accredited by the Southern Association of Colleges and Schools, Southern Association of Independent Schools and AdvancED.

History

Establishment and early years

Franklin Road Academy was founded in 1971 as a segregation academy in response to the court ordered racial integration of public schools. FRA's leaders claimed the school was established to provide a sound, Christian, education in a safer environment, but the sociologist Jennifer Dyer has argued that the school's stated objectives were simply a guise for the school's actual objective of allowing parents to avoid enrolling their children in racially integrated public schools. FRA's first mascot was the Rebels and the school prominently flew the confederate flag.

In a 1980 retrospective interview, founder and headmaster Bill Bradshaw recalled that in the early 1970s, "escape from busing was probably definitely a factor" in the school's initial growth, but he denied that the school was established to avoid desegregation. Bradshaw, who was pictured in the 1979 yearbook in a Confederate Army uniform, acknowledged that the school's Confederate iconography meant that blacks "may have thought" that they were unwelcome at the school, but he expressed hope "in time, that will change." Bradshaw argued that the private school's tuition costs were the main reason few black students enrolled. Bradshaw also noted that blacks "have been inclined to stay in their own groups", referring to the integration of a historically black elementary school in Nashville that was opposed by some African-Americans.

Inquiries from parents to FRA tripled in 1980 after court rulings expanded desegregation busing in Nashville. At the time, only one of Franklin Road's 745 students was black.

In March 1981, the entire board of directors and headmaster Bill Bradshaw resigned in a dispute with First Christian Church, which owned the building used by the school. Football coach Gene Andrews was appointed interim headmaster. On June 3, 1982, Franklin Road Academy became an independent organization styled Franklin Road Academy, Inc. Following its incorporation, FRA received accreditation from the Southern Association of Colleges and Schools.

In 1983, an anonymous donor provided funds to add a second floor to the high school for the creation of a middle school. Four years later, FRA raised $3 million through a capital campaign for the construction of a separate lower school (elementary school). In 1988, the new lower school was dedicated as Danner Hall.

Removal of Confederate symbols
The school stopped flying the Confederate flag in 1991. Headmaster Bill Campbell said the flag was removed to ensure all students and visiting sports teams felt welcome and comfortable at the school. In a guest editorial in The Tennessean, former FRA football coach and interim headmaster Gene Andrews criticized the change, accusing FRA of "turning its back on its heritage" and ignoring the sacrifices made in support of the "just cause" of southern independence.

In 1997, FRA stopped using Rebels as its team name and became the Big Blue. The school had begun to tone down use of the mascot in the early 1990s to make the school more welcoming to minorities. Assistant principal Gary Clarke stated that "We felt, of course, there was a lot of tradition at the school with the Rebels, but we also have to realize that the Rebel flag may be offensive to some." School official stated that the final move was to attract a more diverse study body". The FRA football coach, George Weicker, told The Tennessean that the retirement of the mascot was partially because of the unease the Confederate imagery caused to Dennis Harrison, a former NFL player who was the first black assistant coach at the school. Weicker said that he asked Harrison how he felt about the mascot and what its symbolism meant to him. Weicker said that Harrison told him the mascot made him feel "uncomfortable".

In 2021, the author David Dark noted that he struggled to reckon with yearbook images that showed him at the FRA prom alongside the Confederate flag.

Expansion
In 1999, FRA completed a $7 million middle school and fine arts building. The three-story building houses approximately 300 students in the fifth through eighth grades in one building. The same building also features a theatre as well as two art rooms, a band room, a choir room, four practice rooms with pianos, and a dance studio.

In 2006–2007, the school expanded and improved its campus in a $12 million project. The main school building was renovated to serve athletics and humanities. The new and renovated buildings form a central quadrangle. The school's original classrooms in the former church property were also renovated for foreign language classes. Moving the books into the new Library and Technology Center from the old library took a total of 4 days and the involvement of approximately 600 students.

Franklin Road Academy opened a new innovation science lab that not only extends use to students at FRA but also students in Metro Nashville Public Schools (MNPS). The lab is outfitted with items that include a robotics arena, two 3D printers, a laser cutter and a 3D carver. Nashville Mayor Megan Barry helped dedicate the space. Franklin Road Academy head of school states that "it's a great opportunity to build a collective educational opportunity for everyone." The partnership extends to a summer program where students learn STEAM (Science, technology, engineering, art and math) skills so that student can go onto college and be successful. In 2022, the school established the Center for Entrepreneurial Leadership to expand experiential learning with curriculum and programs to develop foundational skills.

Academics
Following its incorporation, Franklin Road Academy received accreditation from the Southern Association of Colleges and Schools. It is also accredited by the Southern Association of Independent Schools and AdvancED.

FRA has pre-kindergarten through grade 12 classes split into Early Childhood (pre-kindergarten), Lower School (kindergarten-grade 4), Middle School (grades 5-8) and Upper School (grades 9-12) divisions. Courses at FRA include AP authorized by the College Board, Art, Music, Performance Arts and World Language. More than 70 percent of the faculty holds advanced degrees and 100 percent of students are accepted at four-year colleges or universities.

The school has a kindergarten through grade 12 program known as Heart to Heart for full inclusion and educational opportunities to students with Down syndrome. In 2016, the Heart to Heart program was featured on ESPN when student Robert Lewis hit a 3-pointer in his senior night basketball game.

FRA is a member school of the Global Online Academy. It was the first school in Tennessee to become a member.

Campus

The 62-acre Franklin Road Academy campus is located at 4700 Franklin Pike in Oak Hill, Tennessee at the corner of Franklin Pike and Harding Pike. The FRA campus was the site of the Battle of Peach Orchard in the American civil war.

In 1994, the George A. Volkert Athletic Complex was completed. Referred to as "The Hill" by students and faculty, the complex houses a football stadium, baseball stadium, tennis courts, a track, and a softball field.

In 2019, Franklin Road Academy completed the Weicker Center for students and families to "have a space that helps build fellowship and supports the school's commitment to provide one of the finest independent school educational experiences in the nation." The student center is located in the middle of campus and includes a dining hall, classrooms, athletic spaces, admission offices, and campus security office.

In 2021, Franklin Road Academy opened a 4,000-square-foot fitness center that includes women's and men's locker rooms, a digital Alumni Hall of Fame, athletic offices and a training room. This addition was part of a previous expansion of the wrestling room, team film room, dance studio, and high school gym renovations.

Athletics
Franklin Road Academy is a member of the Tennessee Secondary School Athletic Association (TSSAA) and competes in Division II-A. Its athletic programs include cheerleading, cross country, dance, football, golf, soccer, tennis and volleyball during the fall, with basketball, bowling, cheerleading, dance, hockey, swimming and wrestling during the winter, and baseball, dance, lacrosse, softball, tennis and track in the spring.

The 2016 Franklin Road Academy baseball team won the DII-A state championship. The baseball team also won state championships in 1984, 1988, and 2000.

The boys basketball team finished second in the State Championship in 2011, 2014 and 2016–2017. The girls basketball team won the State Championship in 2011 and 2013, with second-place finishes in 2010, 2012, 2015 and 2018.

The boys cross country team has won eight State Championships titles in 1997, 1999, 2000–2003, 2005, and 2018. The girls cross country team won the State Championship from 1996 to 1998.

The football team won the State Championship in 1991.

The boys golf team won the State Championship in 1993 while the girls golf team won the State Championship ten times in 2005, 2006, 2010, 2012, 2013, 2015, 2017–2020.

The boys soccer team finished second place in 2012 and the girls soccer team has recorded four State Championships in 2002, 2004, 2005, and 2007.

The boys tennis won the State title in 2011, while girls tennis won the State title in 2004 and 2007 with a second-place finish in 1998.

The boys track and field team has won 23 State Championships in 1981-82, 1986, 1994-95, 1998-2007, 2012, 2014-16, 2018-19 and 2021-22. The girls track and field team has won six State Championships in 1980, 1998-99, 2000, 2018 and 2022.

Boys wrestling won the 1988 State Championship and the Dual State title in 2005 for Division I Small School.

Notable alumni
William L. Campbell Jr., United States District Judge of the United States District Court for the Middle District of Tennessee
 David Dark, writer 
 Lisa Dale Daniel, American country music artist
 Melodie Malone, Christian singer and musician
Clyde Lee, Basketball player and coach at Franklin Road Academy
Will Wade, Head coach of the Louisiana State University (LSU) men's basketball team
Mason Mingus, stock car racing driver
John Pierce, College basketball player, later coached at FRA

See also
 Education segregation in Nashville

References 

Private K-12 schools in Tennessee
Educational institutions established in 1971
Schools in Davidson County, Tennessee
Segregation academies in Tennessee
1971 establishments in Tennessee
Schools in Nashville, Tennessee
Schools accredited by the Southern Association of Colleges and Schools